Jane Birkin/Serge Gainsbourg (also known as Je t'aime... moi non plus) is a 1969 collaborative studio album by Serge Gainsbourg and Jane Birkin. It was originally released by Fontana Records. It includes "Je t'aime... moi non plus", which reached number 1 on the UK Singles Chart.

The song Jane B is an adaptation of Frédéric Chopin's Fourth Prelude from Opus. 28 in E minor. The music was arranged by Arthur Greenslade.

Critical reception

The album has received critical acclaim. D.M. Edwards of PopMatters stated: "The arrangements by Arthur Greenslade are excellent and there are plenty of glimpses of the experimentation which would be a feature of Gainsbourg's music," further describing the album as "sophisticated, timeless pop music."

In 2017, Pitchfork placed it at number 44 on the "200 Best Albums of the 1960s" list. Writing for Pitchfork, Cameron Cook called it "a love letter read out loud by its recipient: Every note and lyric is meant to highlight a certain aspect of Birkin's persona though Gainsbourg's lens, from her breathless delivery of every line to her heavily accented, coquettish French."

Track listing

Personnel
Credits adapted from liner notes.

 Serge Gainsbourg – vocals
 Jane Birkin – vocals
 Arthur Greenslade – arrangement, orchestral direction
 Jean-Claude Desmarty – artistic production
 Jean D'Hughes – photography

Charts

References

External links
 
 

1969 albums
Jane Birkin albums
Serge Gainsbourg albums
Fontana Records albums
French-language albums
Albums conducted by Arthur Greenslade
Albums arranged by Arthur Greenslade
Vocal duet albums